Sugiono Katijo (born 21 August 1971) is an Indonesian weightlifter. He competed in the men's featherweight event at the 1992 Summer Olympics.

References

External links
 

1971 births
Living people
Indonesian male weightlifters
Olympic weightlifters of Indonesia
Weightlifters at the 1992 Summer Olympics
Place of birth missing (living people)
20th-century Indonesian people
21st-century Indonesian people